Dickey's Octagonal Barbershop, built in 1894, was a historic octagon-shaped barber shop building located on the southwest corner of High and North Church streets, in Rives, Tennessee. It was vacant on April 29, 1975, when it was added to the National Register of Historic Places.  It was delisted in 2019.

References

Commercial buildings on the National Register of Historic Places in Tennessee
Octagonal buildings in the United States
Buildings and structures in Obion County, Tennessee
Commercial buildings completed in 1894
National Register of Historic Places in Obion County, Tennessee
Barber shops
Former National Register of Historic Places in Tennessee